Champion Racing Association (CRA) is a stock car racing sanctioning body based in the Midwestern United States. It was founded in 1997 by Glenn Luckett and R. J. Scott, who then sold the company to Bob Sargent's Track Enterprises in 2022. All CRA cars use Hoosier tires and Sunoco fuel.

CRA-sanctioned series

ARCA/CRA Super Series

The ARCA/CRA Super Series is the premier series of the Champion Racing Association. It was formerly known as the Kendall Late Model Series and the Sunoco Super Series. The series utilizes Super Late Models. Regulations on engine and body are NASCAR legal. Like NASCAR, the car body designs are based on the Chevrolet SS, Dodge Charger, Ford Fusion, and the Toyota Camry. The most recent series champion is Hunter Jack.

JEGS All Stars Tour
Champion Racing Association purchased the Michigan-based Super Pro Series and began in 2011. The JEGS All Stars Tour utilizes Pro Late Models, which is powered by a crate engine. The crate engine rule is meant to reduce the costs of the engines to the competitors. The crate engines are built by the automobile manufacturers themselves, such as General Motors and Ford. The most recent champion is Cody Coughlin in 2021.

Late Model Sportsman Series
The CRA Late Model Sportsman Series debuted in 2005. The most recent champion is Billy Hutson in 2021

Street Stock Series

The CRA Street Stock Series debuted in 2005. The most recent champion is Jason Atkinson in 2021.

Past series

Vore's FWD Compacts Series

The most recent series champion was Jeff Shelmadine in 2011. In late 2011 however, Champion Racing Association disbanded its promotion of the Compacts, and this division is now promoted by series sponsor Vore's Welding.

CRA tracks

Notable drivers 
 Gary St. Amant (2 Time ASA National Champion)
 Chuck Barnes, Jr. (2004 CRA Champion, Roush “Driver X” TV Finalist)
 Kyle Busch (NASCAR driver)
 Landon Cassill (2009 NASCAR Rookie of the Year)
 Chase Elliott (2011 CRA champion)
 Chet Fillip (Little 500 Sprint Car Champion, Daytona 500 & Indy 500 Veteran)
 Jeff Fultz (NASCAR All-Pro Champion)
 Mike Garvey (NASCAR All-Pro Champion, NASCAR Busch, & ASA)
 Bobby Gill (Hooters Pro-Cup Champion, NASCAR Craftsmen Trucks)
 Charlie Glotzbach (1964 ARCA Rookie of the Year)
 Brett Sontag (2004 ASA National Tour Rookie of the Year)
 Nathan Haseleu (Former NASCAR Craftsman Truck Series driver)
 Shelby Howard (NASCAR Craftsmen Trucks, Busch and Hooters Pro-Cup)
 Joel Kauffman (2002 CRA Champion, Hooters and NASCAR Busch)
 Ryan Newman (NASCAR driver)
 Ken Schrader (former NASCAR driver)
 David Stremme (NASCAR driver)
 Kenny Wallace (NASCAR driver)

External links
 Champion Racing Association

References
 CRA FAQs
 Article:Champion Racing Association – Taking Control

1997 establishments in Indiana
Organizations established in 1997
Auto racing organizations in the United States
Stock car racing
Organizations based in Indiana